Tanjung Balai (Indonesian: Kota Tanjung Balai), formerly known as Tanjung Balai-Asahan is a city in North Sumatra province, Indonesia, on the estuary of the Asahan River. The town has a ferry terminal with services to Port Klang, Malaysia, and the city-island of Singapore.

It was formerly a district of Asahan Regency until it was elevated to city status, but the tag "Asahan" is still used to distinguish it from the port of the same name on Great Karimun island. After the separation of Tanjungbalai from Asahan Regency, it technically became an enclave within Asahan Regency.

Administrative divisions
The city is divided administratively into six districts (kecamatan), tabulated below with their areas and their populations at the 2010 Census  and 2020 Census.

Tanjungbalai Asahan Port (Teluk Nibung Port)
The Port has warehouse facilities and stacking fields. This port also carries out cargo and passenger services with activities mainly in exporting vegetables and fish to Malaysia. The port has passenger services to Port Klang and Port of Melintang Forest, Perak.
Teluk Nibung passenger terminal currently has an area of about 2,500 square metres, consisting of two floors with a capacity of around 800 people. 1st floor for check-in, customs, immigration for arrivals, VIP rooms, quarantine rooms and 2nd floor for immigration rooms for departures, passenger waiting rooms, food court and coffee shops.

Climate
Tanjungbalai has a tropical rainforest climate (Af) with moderate rainfall from January to July and heavy rainfall from August to December.

Gallery

References

Populated places in North Sumatra
Cities in North Sumatra